Nakayama Dam is a gravity dam located in Toyama prefecture in Japan. The dam is used for power production. The catchment area of the dam is 108.3 km2. The dam impounds about 2  ha of land when full and can store 111 thousand cubic meters of water. The construction of the dam was started on 1960 and completed in 1961.

References

Dams in Toyama Prefecture
1961 establishments in Japan